KOTZ is a non-commercial radio station in Kotzebue, Alaska, broadcasting on 720 AM.

Translators

External links
KOTZ's Website

Radio Locator Information for KINU-FM

OTZ
OTZ
NPR member stations
Radio stations established in 1974